Frank Mosvold (born 7 May 1965) is a Norwegian film and television producer. He has a B.S. in economics from Babson College (Wellesley, Ma) and Master in fine art in film production from Loyola Marymount University (Los Angeles, CA). In 1996 Frank Mosvold started his own production company, Kool Produktion AS.  He has produced several award-winning shorts, including the Terje Vigen award at the Norwegian Short Film Festival for the film An Accidental Story. In 2004 he begin work on the animated television series together with Tom Petter Hansen and Trond Morten Venaasen. Together they have produced the animated television series Hubert and Sunshine Kathy (also known as Ella Bella Bingo) and its 2020 film adaptation.

References

External links 
 
KOOL Produktion AS

Norwegian film producers
Living people
1965 births